Ali Jawad (born 12 January 1989) is a British Paralympic powerlifter competing in the −59 kg class. Born without legs, he took up powerlifting at the age of 16. He competed in the 2012 Summer Paralympics in London, finishing fourth. The following year he took gold at the Asian Open Championships making a world record lift of 185.5 kg. At the 2014 IPC Powerlifting World Championships in Dubai, he became World Champion in his class, setting another world record, lifting 190 kg.

Personal history
Jawad, who was born without legs, spent the first six months of his life in his parents' home country of Lebanon. Jawad has two short yet powerful stumps for legs, which end mid-thigh. His early life coincided with a conflict between Lebanon and Israel, and his parents chose to emigrate to Great Britain for their children's safety. The family took up residence in Tottenham, London. Jawad has also been diagnosed with Crohn's disease and is a high-profile supporter of charities which support sufferers of the disease. He almost died in 2010 from this disease.

Powerlifting career
Jawad became a British Junior Powerlifting champion, and has set junior British and European records. He is currently ranked number 2 in the World Under-23 Powerlifting category. Jawad competes for the Wood Green Weightlifting Club, and the University of East London.

Jawad competed as an international-level Judoka before becoming a powerlifter. He won silver in the Junior World Championship powerlifting in 2006, and gold in the European Championships in 2007. He also won gold at the World junior championships in 2008, setting a British junior and senior record and a European junior record. He also lifted the second biggest weight in Great Britain's paralympic powerlifting history at just 19. He won junior gold at the European championships in 2007 and at 17 years old finishing 4th in the senior category.

In the run up to the 2016 Summer Paralympics in Rio, Jawad competed in the 2015 IPC European Powerlifting Championships in Eger, Hungary. There he secured a gold medal in the −65 kg class.

See also
 List of people diagnosed with Crohn's disease

References

External links

 
 
 
 

1989 births
Living people
English male weightlifters
English strength athletes
British powerlifters
Lebanese powerlifters
Lebanese strength athletes
Paralympic powerlifters of Great Britain
Paralympic silver medalists for Great Britain
Paralympic medalists in powerlifting
Medalists at the 2016 Summer Paralympics
Powerlifters at the 2012 Summer Paralympics
Powerlifters at the 2016 Summer Paralympics
Powerlifters at the 2020 Summer Paralympics
Commonwealth Games bronze medallists for England
Commonwealth Games medallists in powerlifting
Powerlifters at the 2010 Commonwealth Games
Powerlifters at the 2014 Commonwealth Games
Powerlifters at the 2018 Commonwealth Games
Lebanese emigrants to the United Kingdom
Sportspeople of Lebanese descent
People from Tottenham
21st-century British people
Medallists at the 2014 Commonwealth Games
Medallists at the 2018 Commonwealth Games